John H. Roelker House is a historic home located in downtown Evansville, Indiana. It was built in 1858, and is a three-story, four bay, brick dwelling.

It was listed on the National Register of Historic Places in 1984.

References

Houses on the National Register of Historic Places in Indiana
Houses completed in 1858
Houses in Evansville, Indiana
National Register of Historic Places in Evansville, Indiana